The Chinese Basketball Association, often abbreviated as the CBA, is the first-tier professional men's basketball league in China.

The league is commonly known by fans as the CBA, and this acronym is even used in Chinese on a regular basis. The CBA should not be confused with the National Basketball League (NBL), which is a professional minor league. There is also a Women's Chinese Basketball Association (WCBA).

A few Chinese players who competed in the CBA in the early stages of their careers — including Wang Zhizhi, Mengke Bateer, Yao Ming, Yi Jianlian, Sun Yue, and Zhou Qi — have also played in the National Basketball Association (NBA). Others such as Xue Yuyang and Wang Zhelin were chosen in the draft, but have not played in the NBA.

Only a limited number of foreign players are allowed on each CBA team. Notable imports include former NBA All-Stars Stephon Marbury, Tracy McGrady, Gilbert Arenas, Steve Francis, Metta World Peace and Kenyon Martin — as well as several NBA veterans who would become CBA All-Stars — Michael Beasley, Aaron Brooks, Jimmer Fredette, Al Harrington, Lester Hudson, Randolph Morris, Shavlik Randolph, Jeremy Lin and J.R. Smith.

Background 
The CBA began play in the 1995–96 season. The league should not be confused with the Chinese Basketball Association (organisation), which was founded in June 1956 and represents the country in matters involving the sport's governing body, FIBA. Basketball in China is currently regulated by the Chinese Basketball Management Center.

Other Chinese basketball leagues include the National Basketball League (NBL), the Chinese University Basketball Association (CUBA), and the Chinese High School Basketball League (CHBL). At one time there was a league called the Chinese New Basketball Alliance (CNBA), one of whose most prominent teams was the Beijing Sea Lions, but this venture lasted for just one winter (1996–97).

The first non-Chinese player to compete in the CBA was Mihail Savinkov of Uzbekistan, who joined the Zhejiang Squirrels in the league's inaugural 1995–96 campaign. During the 1996–97 season, James Hodges became one of the first Americans to play in the CBA, and his signing by the Liaoning Hunters helped pave the way for many more imports from the United States to follow in the ensuing years.

Some other notable foreign pioneers included John Spencer, who joined the Jiangsu Dragons later in the 1996–97 campaign, and David Vanterpool, who inked a deal with the Jilin Northeast Tigers the following winter, and helped the team move up to the CBA in time for the 1998–99 season. The CBA's first international coach was American Robert Hoggard, who led the Sichuan Pandas for the last eight games of the 1997–98 campaign.

Team names 
For a full list of teams, see Current clubs section below. Also see :Category:Chinese Basketball Association teams.

The full name of each team usually consists of three parts, in the following order:

 A geographic designation (except in the case of Bayi, which technically translates into English as "August First," the day China's People's Liberation Army was founded). All others are province-level designations (either a province or a Chinese municipality).
 A corporate sponsor name. This sponsor may change from year to year, and sometimes even in mid-season.
 A nickname, such as the name of an animal.

The presence of corporate sponsor names can occasionally lead to confusion about what name to use in English because many variants may be seen. Team names are usually abbreviated (in Chinese or English), so that either the corporate sponsor name or the nickname is used interchangeably (rarely both). In addition, team nicknames can sometimes be translated into English in more than one way, and corporate sponsors tend to change frequently over time.

Nickname changes are rare, but occasionally happen, such as when the Shandong team switched from Flaming Bulls (1995) to Lions (2003) to Gold Lions (2004) to Golden Stars (2014). Other examples include the Liaoning team dumping Hunters (1995) for Dinosaurs (2008) and then Flying Leopards (2011) -- as well as the Foshan team's evolving attempts to "Anglicize" its nickname—by going from Kylins (2001) to Dralions to Long-Lions.

In previous years, the title of the league itself was available for corporate naming sponsorship. In 1999–2000 and 2000–2001 it was known as the Hilton League, in 2001–2002 and 2002–2003 it was the Motorola League, and in 2003–2004 it was sponsored by China Unicom. These corporate league titles were not always used in the news media, however, and this sponsorship practice was discontinued at the start of the 2004–2005 season.

Current clubs 
While teams are listed by division here, the CBA does not use these designations for regular season purposes anymore, as each squad now plays each other once at home and once on the road (plus eight additional games within each of the four rotating "strength of schedule" sub-groupings). Divisions are used for the league's annual All-Star Game, however, and are shown here for the sake of convenience.

Timeline 
This is a chronological listing of current and former CBA teams according to the season that they entered the league.

Finals 

In 2005, the league unveiled the Mou Zuoyun Cup, which was awarded for the first time to the winning team in the CBA Finals. Mou Zuoyun (1913–2007) was a member of the Chinese men's national basketball team which competed at the 1936 Summer Olympics, and he later served as a coach and a pioneer in building Chinese basketball.

Finals appearances 
This is a list of the teams which have advanced to the CBA Finals and the overall win–loss records they have registered in the Championship Series.

Awards 
The CBA Most Valuable Player award is presented to the league's best player in a given CBA season. Since the 2012–13 campaign, two awards have been handed out each year, Domestic MVP and International MVP. The rules for the selection of the MVP in the regular season are: the number of games must reach 28 or more; The comprehensive score of individual technical indicators ranks among the best; The team won the top three in the regular season. At the conclusion of each season, the CBA Finals MVP award is bestowed upon the most outstanding player in that year's championship series.

Each campaign's scoring leader is also recognized on an annual basis and the league maintains a list of single game, single season, and career record holders in various statistical categories. Furthermore, a CBA All-Star Game MVP award is given to the player deemed to have the most impactful performance in the league's annual mid-season exhibition contest.

The CBA Best Defender award is presented to the league's most hard-skilled and efficient defender in a given season of the CBA.

Scoring leaders

The CBA's highest single season scoring average, depending on how many games are required to be recognized as a statistical qualifier, is either 43.1 points per game by Jordan Crawford, who played in 26 of Tianjin's 38 games (68.4%) in 2015–16, or 42.0 points per game by Jonathan Gibson, who played in 36 of Qingdao's 38 games (94.7%) in 2015–16.

Rebounding leaders

Records

This is a list of individual records separated into two categories — career records and single game records.

Records last updated and confirmed on March 13, 2019, the final day of the 2018–19 CBA regular season.

Single game records

Career records

Notable players 
Listed below are some of the most accomplished Chinese players who have competed in the CBA. Time spent with teams in lower leagues before they joined the CBA, or after they left the CBA, cannot be counted as CBA seasons. Notes will be made of such service below a player's CBA information.

Domestic players from the CBA who are known for crossing over to the NBA

Domestic players from the CBA who were drafted but have not played in the NBA

Domestic players from the CBA who have only played in NBA pre-season games

Domestic players from the CBA who have participated in the NBA Summer League 

Note: The Red Squad of the Chinese National Team toured the United States and played several NBA Summer League teams during the 2018 NBA Summer League season while the combined Chinese National Team did likewise during the 2019 NBA Summer League season.

Domestic players from the CBA who are known for league or national team exploits 
Scroll down to view more names.
  Du Feng ~ Guangdong Southern Tigers 1997–98, 1998–99, 1999–2000, 2000–01, 2001–02, 2002–03, 2003–04, 2004–05, 2005–06, 2006–07, 2007–08, 2008–09, 2009–10, 2010–11, 2011–12
  Gong Xiaobin ~ Shandong Flaming Bulls 1995–96, 1996–97, 1997–98, 1998–99, 1999–2000, 2000–01, 2001–02, 2002–03
  Guo Ailun ~ Liaoning Dinosaurs/Flying Leopards 2010–11, 2011–12, 2012–13, 2013–14, 2014–15, 2015–16, 2016–17, 2017–18, 2018–19, 2019–20
  Guo Shiqiang ~ Liaoning Hunters 1995–96, 1996–97, 1997–98, 1998–99, 1999–2000, 2000–01, 2001–02, 2002–03, 2003–04, 2004–05
  Han Dejun ~ Liaoning Hunters/Dinosaurs/Flying Leopards 2007–08, 2008–09, 2009–10, 2010–11, 2011–12, 2012–13, 2013–14, 2014–15, 2015–16, 2016–17, 2017–18, 2018–19, 2019–20
  Hu Weidong ~ Jiangsu Dragons 1995–96, 1996–97, 1997–98, 1998–99, 1999–2000, 2000–01, 2001–02, 2002–03, 2003–04
  Hu Xuefeng ~ Jiangsu Dragons 1999–2000, 2000–01, 2001–02, 2002–03, 2003–04, 2004–05, 2005–06, 2006–07, 2007–08, 2008–09, 2009–10, 2010–11, 2011–12, 2012–13, 2013–14, 2014–15, 2015–16, 2016–17
  Li Gen ~ Shanghai Sharks 2008–09, 2009–10, Qingdao Eagles 2010–11, 2011–12, Beijing Ducks 2012–13, 2013–14, 2014–15, Xinjiang Flying Tigers 2015–16, 2016–17, 2017–18, 2018–19, Shanghai Sharks 2019–20
  Li Nan ~ Bayi Rockets 1995–96, 1996–97, 1997–98, 1998–99, 1999–2000, 2000–01, 2001–02, 2002–03, 2003–04, 2004–05, 2005–06, 2006–07, 2007–08, 2008–09
  Li Xiaoxu ~ Liaoning Hunters/Dinosaurs/Flying Leopards 2005–06, 2006–07, 2007–08, 2008–09, 2009–10, 2010–11, 2011–12, 2012–13, 2013–14, 2014–15, 2015–16, 2016–17, 2017–18, 2018–19, 2019–20
  Liu Yudong ~ Bayi Rockets 1995–96, 1996–97, 1997–98, 1998–99, 1999–2000, 2000–01, 2001–02, 2002–03, 2003–04, 2004–05, Fujian Xunxing 2007–08, 2008–09, 2009–10
  Shang Ping ~ Beijing Ducks 2009–10, Shanxi Brave Dragons 2010–11, 2011–12, Qingdao Eagles 2012–13, Tianjin Gold Lions 2014–15, 2015–16
  Sun Jun ~ Jilin Northeast Tigers 1998–99, 1999–2000, 2000–01, 2001–02, 2002–03, 2003–04, 2004–05, 2005–06
  Sun Mingming ~ Beijing Ducks 2009–10, 2010–11, 2011–12
  Tang Zhengdong ~ Jiangsu Dragons 2003–04, 2004–05, 2005–06, 2006–07, 2007–08, 2008–09, 2009–10, 2010–11, Xinjiang Flying Tigers 2011–12, 2012–13, 2013–14, 2014–15, Foshan Long-Lions 2015–16, Jiangsu Tongxi/Nanjing Monkey Kings 2016–17, 2017–18
  Wang Shipeng ~ Guangdong Southern Tigers 2003–04, 2004–05, 2005–06, 2006–07, 2007–08, 2008–09, 2009–10, 2010–11, 2011–12, 2012–13, 2013–14, 2014–15, 2015–16
  Zhai Xiaochuan ~ Beijing Ducks 2011–12, 2012–13, 2013–14, 2014–15, 2015–16, 2016–17, 2017–18, 2018–19, 2019–20
  Zhang Qingpeng ~ Liaoning Hunters/Dinosaurs 2001–02, 2002–03, 2003–04, 2004–05, 2005–06, 2006–07, 2007–08, 2008–09, 2009–10, Xinjiang Flying Tigers 2010–11, Liaoning Flying Leopards 2011–12, Xinjiang Flying Tigers 2012–13, 2013–14, Beijing Ducks 2014–15, 2015–16, 2016–17, Qingdao Eagles 2017–18, 2018–19, Shandong Heroes 2019–20
  Zhao Tailong ~ Fujian Xunxing/Sturgeons 2007–08, 2008–09, 2009–10, 2010–11, 2011–12, 2012–13, 2013–14, 2014–15, 2015–16, 2016–17, 2017–18, 2018–19, Qingdao Eagles 2019–20
  Zhou Peng ~ Guangdong Southern Tigers 2006–07, 2007–08, 2008–09, 2009–10, 2010–11, 2011–12, 2012–13, 2013–14, 2014–15, 2015–16, 2016–17, 2017–18, 2018–19
  Zhu Fangyu ~ Guangdong Southern Tigers 1999–2000, 2000–01, 2001–02, 2002–03, 2003–04, 2004–05, 2005–06, 2006–07, 2007–08, 2008–09, 2009–10, 2010–11, 2011–12, 2012–13, 2013–14, 2014–15, 2015–16, 2016–17

Foreign imports 
Listed below are some of the most accomplished foreign imports who have competed in the CBA. Players must appear in at least one game for the team to receive credit for a season. Someone who signs a contract but never steps on the court does not count.

Policy 
Every team can register up to four foreign players per season. During the regular season, the policy of four (maximum) foreign players on the field for four quarters and four times per game (full of one per quarter) is adopted, while the team ranked in the bottom four last season may adopt the policy of four (maximum) foreign players for four quarters and five times per game (full of two times per quarter in the first three quarters and one time per quarter in the last quarter). During the playoffs, all teams will adopt a four-player (maximum) four-period four-times policy for foreign players (maximum of one per period)

Non-Chinese players who spent 5 or more seasons in the CBA 
Scroll down to view more names
  Zaid Abbas ~ Shanghai Sharks 2009–10, Beijing Ducks 2010–11, Fujian Sturgeons 2011–12, Shandong Gold Lions 2012–13, Tianjin Gold Lions 2013–14, Shanxi Brave Dragons 2014–15, Tongxi Monkey Kings 2016–17, Beikong Fly Dragons 2017–18
  Josh Akognon ~ Dongguan Leopards 2010–11, 2011–12, Liaoning Flying Leopards 2012–13, Qingdao Eagles 2013–14, Foshan Long-Lions 2014–15, Jilin Northeast Tigers 2015–16
  Levan Alston Sr. ~ Beijing Ducks 1997–98, 1998–99, 1999–00, 2000–01, 2001–02, Shandong Flaming Bulls 2002–03
  Andray Blatche ~ Xinjiang Flying Tigers 2014–15, 2015–16, 2016–17, 2017–18, Tianjin Gold Lions 2018–19
  MarShon Brooks ~ Jiangsu Dragons 2015–16, 2016–17, 2017–18, Guangdong Southern Tigers 2018–19, 2019–20
  Dwight Buycks ~ Tianjin Gold Lions 2014–15, Fujian Sturgeons 2015–16, 2016–17, Shenzhen Leopards/Aviators 2018–19, 2019–20
  Ike Diogu ~ Xinjiang Flying Tigers 2011–12, Guangdong Southern Tigers 2012–13, Dongguan Leopards 2014–15, Guangdong Southern Tigers 2015–16, Tongxi Monkey Kings 2016–17, Sichuan Blue Whales 2017–18
  Jason Dixon ~ Guangdong Southern Tigers 1998–99, 1999–00, 2000–01, 2002–03, 2003–04, 2004–05, 2005–06, 2006–07, 2007–08, 2008–09
  Jamaal Franklin ~ Guangsha Lions 2014–15, Shanxi Brave Dragons 2015–16, 2016–17, Sichuan Blue Whales 2017–18, 2018–19, Shanxi Loongs 2019–20
  Charles Gaines ~ Xinjiang Flying Tigers 2009–10, Qingdao Eagles 2010–11, Shanxi Brave Dragons 2011–12, 2012–13, 2013–14, Zhejiang Golden Bulls 2014–15, 2015–16
  Jonathan Gibson ~ Guangsha Lions 2013–14, Qingdao Eagles 2015–16, 2017–18, 2018–19, Jiangsu Dragons 2019–20
  Rod Gregoire ~ Jilin Northeast Tigers 2000–01, 2001–02, 2002–03, 2003–04, 2004–05, 2005–06
  Hamed Haddadi ~ Sichuan Blue Whales 2013–14, Qingdao Eagles 2014–15, Sichuan Blue Whales 2015–16, 2016–17, 2017–18, Xinjiang Flying Tigers 2018–19, Nanjing Monkey Kings 2019–20
  Mike Harris ~ Dongguan Leopards 2007–08, 2008–09, Shanghai Sharks 2010–11, 2011–12, Jiangsu Dragons 2012–13, Zhejiang Golden Bulls 2013–14, Qingdao Eagles 2014–15, Sichuan Blue Whales 2015–16, 2016–17, Fujian Sturgeons 2017–18
  Donnell Harvey ~ Jiangsu Dragons 2008–09, 2009–10, Tianjin Gold Lions 2011–12, 2012–13, Shandong Gold Lions 2013–14
  Eli Holman ~ Guangsha Lions 2014–15, 2015–16, 2016–17, Tianjin Gold Lions 2017–18, Jilin Northeast Tigers 2019–20
  Lester Hudson ~ Guangdong Southern Tigers 2010–11, Qingdao Eagles 2011–12, Dongguan Leopards 2012–13, Xinjiang Flying Tigers 2013–14, Liaoning Flying Leopards 2014–15, 2015–16, 2016–17, 2017–18, 2018–19, Shandong Heroes 2019–20
  Eugene "Pooh" Jeter ~ Shandong Gold Lions/Golden Stars 2012–13, 2013–14, 2014–15, 2015–16, Tianjin Gold Lions 2016–17, 2017–18, Fujian Sturgeons 2018–19, 2019–20
  Dominique Jones ~ Liaoning Flying Leopards 2013–14, Jilin Northeast Tigers 2014–15, Shanxi Brave Dragons 2015–16, Qingdao Eagles 2016–17, Nanjing Monkey Kings 2017–18, Jilin Northeast Tigers 2018–19, 2019–20
  Stephon Marbury ~ Shanxi Brave Dragons 2009–10, Foshan Dralions 2010–11, Beijing Ducks 2011–12, 2012–13, 2013–14, 2014–15, 2015–16, 2016–17, Beikong Fly Dragons 2017–18
  Will McDonald ~ Fujian Sturgeons 2011–12, 2012–13, 2013–14, Tongxi Monkey Kings 2014–15, Jiangsu Dragons 2015–16
  Randolph Morris ~ Beijing Ducks 2010–11, 2011–12, 2012–13, 2013–14, 2014–15, 2015–16, 2016–17
  Olumide Oyedeji ~ Beijing Ducks 2003–04, 2004–05, 2007–08, Shanxi Brave Dragons 2008–09, Liaoning Dinosaurs 2009–10, Qingdao Eagles 2011–12
  Peter John Ramos ~ Guangsha Lions 2009–10, 2010–11, 2011–12, 2012–13, Qingdao Eagles 2013–14, Jilin Northeast Tigers 2015–16
  Shavlik Randolph ~ Dongguan Leopards 2011–12, Foshan Dralions 2012–13, 2013–14, Liaoning Flying Leopards 2015–16, 2016–17, Beikong Fly Dragons 2017–18, 2018–19
  Sani Sakakini ~ Qingdao Eagles 2011–12, 2013–14, Tongxi Monkey Kings 2015–16, Tianjin Gold Lions 2016–17, Guangzhou Long-Lions 2017–18, Beikong Royal Fighters 2019–20
  Soumaila Samake ~ Zhejiang Cyclones 2004–05, 2005–06, 2006–07, 2007–08, Jilin Northeast Tigers 2008–09, 2009–10
  God Shammgod ~ Zhejiang Cyclones 2001–02, 2002–03, 2003–04, 2004–05, Shanxi Brave Dragons 2006–07
  Von Wafer ~ Xinjiang Flying Tigers 2012–13, Shanghai Sharks 2013–14, Shanxi Brave Dragons 2014–15, Tongxi Monkey Kings 2015–16, Jilin Northeast Tigers 2017–18
  Jameel Watkins ~ Fujian Xunxing 2007–08, Jiangsu Dragons 2008–09, 2009–10, Jilin Northeast Tigers 2010–11, 2011–12
  Rodney White ~ Guangsha Lions 2007–08, 2008–09, 2009–10, Shandong Gold Lions 2010–11, Guangsha Lions 2011–12
  Marcus E. Williams ~ Zhejiang Golden Bulls 2009–10, 2010–11, Shanxi Brave Dragons 2011–12, 2012–13, 2013–14, Jilin Northeast Tigers 2015–16

Non-Chinese players who spent 2 to 4 seasons in the CBA 
Scroll down to view more names
  George Ackles ~ Shanghai Sharks 2000–01, Beijing Ducks 2001–02
  Darius Adams ~ Xinjiang Flying Tigers 2016–17, 2017–18, 2018–19, Qingdao Eagles 2019–20
  Myron Allen ~ Xinjiang Flying Tigers 2008–09, 2009–10, Shandong Gold Lions 2010–11
  Gilbert Arenas ~ Shanghai Sharks 2012–13, 2013–14
  Samad Nikkhah Bahrami ~ Fujian Sturgeons 2013–14, Zhejiang Golden Bulls 2015–16, Guangzhou Long-Lions 2016–17, Nanjing Monkey Kings 2017–18
  Brandon Bass ~ Liaoning Flying Leopards 2017–18, 2018–19, 2019–20
  Esteban Batista ~ Beikong Fly Dragons 2015–16, 2016–17
  Michael Beasley ~ Shanghai Sharks 2014–15, Shandong Golden Stars 2015–16, Guangdong Southern Tigers 2018–19
  Jerrelle Benimon ~ Foshan Long-Lions 2015–16, Qingdao Eagles 2016–17
  Josh Boone ~ Zhejiang Golden Bulls 2010–11, 2011–12, 2012–13
  Ioannis Bourousis ~ Guangsha Lions 2017–18, 2018–19
  Denzel Bowles ~ Jilin Northeast Tigers 2013–14, 2014–15
  Bobby Brown ~ Dongguan/Shenzhen Leopards 2013–14, 2014–15, 2015–16, Shanxi Loongs 2018–19
  Ernest Brown ~ Liaoning Hunters 2004–05, 2006–07
  Jabari Brown ~ Foshan Long-Lions 2015–16, Jilin Northeast Tigers 2016–17, Jiangsu Dragons 2017–18
  Lorenzo Brown ~ Zhejiang Golden Bulls 2016–17, Guangzhou Long-Lions 2018–19
  Will Bynum ~ Guangdong Southern Tigers 2014–15, 2015–16
  Babacar Camara ~ Jilin Northeast Tigers 2005–06, 2006–07
  Alex Carcamo ~ Shenzhen Yikang 2000–01, Guangdong Southern Tigers 2001–02
  Lorenzo Coleman ~ Xinjiang Flying Tigers 2003–04, 2004–05, 2005–06, 2006–07
  Peter Cornell ~ Zhejiang Cyclones 2003–04, Guangdong Southern Tigers 2004–05
  Jordan Crawford ~ Xinjiang Flying Tigers 2014–15, Tianjin Gold Lions 2015–16, Sichuan Blue Whales 2018–19
  Brandon Crump ~ Shaanxi Kylins 2005–06, 2006–07
  Osama "Sam" Daghles ~ Jilin Northeast Tigers 2011–12, Tianjin Gold Lions 2012–13, Jilin Northeast Tigers 2013–14
  Samuel Dalembert ~ Shanxi Brave Dragons 2015–16, 2016–17
  Chris Daniels ~ Qingdao Eagles 2012–13, Liaoning Flying Leopards 2013–14, Guangdong Southern Tigers 2014–15
  Marcus Denmon ~ Zhejiang Golden Bulls 2018–19, 2019–20
  Justin Dentmon ~ Qingdao Eagles 2014–15, Sichuan Blue Whales 2015–16, Shandong Golden Stars 2016–17
  Carlos Dixon ~ Jiangsu Dragons 2005–06, 2006–07
  Quincy Douby ~ Xinjiang Flying Tigers 2010–11, Zhejiang Golden Bulls 2012–13, Shanghai Sharks 2013–14, Tianjin Gold Lions 2014–15
  Marcus Douthit ~ Foshan Dralions 2011–12, 2012–13
  Michael Efevberha ~ Sichuan Blue Whales 2013–14, 2014–15
  Ed Elisma ~ Shandong Lions 2003–04, Henan Dragons 2004–05
  LeRon Ellis ~ Beijing Olympians 1999–00, 2001–02
  Andre Emmett ~ Shandong Gold Lions 2009–10, Fujian Sturgeons 2010–11
  Rony Fahed ~ Tianjin Gold Lions 2009–10, 2011–12
  Kay Felder ~ Xinjiang Flying Tigers 2018–19, 2019–20
  Kyle Fogg ~ Guangzhou Long-Lions 2017–18, 2018–19, Beikong Royal Fighters 2019–20
  Alton Ford ~ Fujian Sturgeons 2004–05, Xinjiang Flying Tigers 2009–10
  Ryan Forehan-Kelly ~ Jiangsu Dragons 2004–05, 2007–08, Shanghai Sharks 2011–12
  Courtney Fortson ~ Guangsha Lions 2016–17, 2017–18, 2018–19, Sichuan Blue Whales 2019–20
  Jimmer Fredette ~ Shanghai Sharks 2016–17, 2017–18, 2018–19
  Andrew Goudelock ~ Xinjiang Flying Tigers 2015–16, Shandong Golden Stars 2018–19
  Terrance Green ~ Guangdong Southern Tigers 2005–06, 2006–07
  Martin Green-Werscott ~ Jiangsu Dragons 2004–05, 2007–08
  Marcus Haislip ~ Guangdong Southern Tigers 2010–11, Foshan Dralions 2011–12, Dongguan Leopards 2012–13, Jiangsu Dragons 2013–14
  Simeon Haley ~ Jiangsu Dragons 2002–03, 2003–04, 2004–05
  Justin Hamilton ~ Beijing Ducks 2017–18, 2018–19, 2019–20
  Tyler Hansbrough ~ Guangzhou Long-Lions 2017–18, Zhejiang Golden Bulls 2018–19, Sichuan Blue Whales 2019–20
  David Harrison ~ Beijing Ducks 2008–09, Guangdong Southern Tigers 2009–10, 2010–11, Tianjin Gold Lions 2011–12
  Stephen Hart ~ Shanghai Sharks 2001–02, Jiangsu Dragons 2002–03
  Chris Herren ~ Beijing Ducks 2002–03, Jiangsu Dragons 2003–04
  J.J. Hickson ~ Fujian Sturgeons 2016–17, Nanjing Monkey Kings 2017–18
  James Hodges ~ Liaoning Hunters 1996–97, Jiangsu Dragons 1997–98, Liaoning Hunters 1998–99, 1999–00
  Othello Hunter ~ Shandong Gold Lions 2011–12, Jiangsu Dragons 2012–13
  Aaron Jackson ~ Beijing Ducks 2017–18, 2018–19, Guangsha Lions 2019–20
  Darnell Jackson ~ Xinjiang Flying Tigers 2012–13, Shanghai Sharks 2013–14
  Pierre Jackson ~ Beikong Fly Dragons 2018–19, Shenzhen Aviators 2019–20
  Bernard James ~ Shanghai Sharks 2014–15, 2015–16
  Chris Johnson ~ Guangsha Lions 2013–14, Zhejiang Golden Bulls 2014–15
  Dakari Johnson ~ Qingdao Eagles 2018–19, 2019–20
  Ivan Johnson ~ Qingdao Eagles 2011–12, Zhejiang Golden Bulls 2013–14
  Dwayne Jones ~ Fujian Sturgeons 2010–11, Guangsha Lions 2011–12
  Garth Joseph ~ Shaanxi Kylins 2001–02, 2002–03, 2003–04, 2004–05
  Mehdi Kamrani ~ Tongxi Monkey Kings 2014–15, Beikong Fly Dragons 2015–16, Jilin Northeast Tigers 2016–17
  Fadi El Khatib ~ Foshan Long-Lions 2014–15, Fujian Sturgeons 2015–16
  Maciej Lampe ~ Shenzhen Leopards 2016–17, Qingdao Eagles 2017–18, Jilin Northeast Tigers 2018–19
  Ty Lawson ~ Shandong Golden Stars 2017–18, 2018–19, Fujian Sturgeons 2019–20
  Justin Love ~ Beijing Olympians 2002–03, 2003–04
  John Lucas III ~ Shanghai Sharks 2009–10, 2010–11, Fujian Sturgeons 2014–15
  Michael Madanly ~ Foshan Dralions 2011–12, 2012–13, Qingdao Eagles 2013–14, Jilin Northeast Tigers 2014–15
  James Mays ~ Beijing Ducks 2009–10, Qingdao Eagles 2017–18, Shandong Heroes 2019–20
  Jelani McCoy ~ Jiangsu Dragons 2004–05, Guangsha Lions 2008–09, Fujian Xunxing 2009–10
  Errick McCollum ~ Zhejiang Golden Bulls 2014–15, Beikong Fly Dragons 2016–17
  Nick Minnerath ~ Shanghai Sharks 2017–18, Xinjiang Flying Tigers 2018–19
  Gabe Muoneke ~ Beijing Olympians 2003–04, Guangsha Lions 2006–07, Yunnan Bulls 2008–09
  Donatas Motiejūnas ~ Shandong Golden Stars 2017–18, 2018–19, Shanghai Sharks 2019–20
  Shabazz Muhammad ~ Shanxi Loongs 2018–19, Shenzhen Aviators 2019–20
  Lamond Murray ~ Guangdong Southern Tigers 2006–07, 2007–08, 2008–09
  Anthony Myles ~ Dongguan Leopards 2005–06, 2006–07
  Hamady N'Diaye ~ Foshan Dralions 2011–12, Tianjin Gold Lions 2012–13
  Andrew Nicholson ~ Guangdong Southern Tigers 2017–18, Fujian Sturgeons 2018–19, Guangzhou Loong-Lions 2019–20
  Reggie Okosa ~ Shanghai Sharks 2005–06, 2006–07, Qingdao Eagles 2009–10, Xinjiang Flying Tigers 2013–14
  Jeremy Pargo ~ Guangsha Lions 2015–16, Shenzhen Leopards 2016–17, Nanjing Monkey Kings 2017–18
  Smush Parker ~ Guangdong Southern Tigers 2008–09, 2009–10
  Tim Pickett ~ Shanxi Brave Dragons 2008–09, Shaanxi Kylins 2009–10, Jilin Northeast Tigers 2010–11, Xinjiang Flying Tigers 2011–12
  Chris Porter ~ Fujian Xunxing 2005–06, 2006–07
  Josh Powell ~ Liaoning Flying Leopards 2011–12, Guangdong Southern Tigers 2013–14
  A.J. Price ~ Shanghai Sharks 2015–16, Shandong Golden Stars 2016–17
  Laron Profit ~ Guangdong Southern Tigers 2002–03, 2003–04
  Miroslav Raduljica ~ Shandong Gold Lions 2014–15, Jiangsu Dragons 2017–18, 2018–19, 2019–20
  Andre Reid ~ Liaoning Hunters 1998–99, 2000–01, 2001–02
  Kit Rhymer ~ Henan Dragons 2005–06, Fujian Xunxing 2006–07
  Thomas Robinson ~ Beikong Fly Dragons 2018–19, Sichuan Blue Whales 2019–20
  Leon Rodgers ~ Jilin Northeast Tigers 2008–09, 2009–10, Shanxi Brave Dragons 2010–11, Jilin Northeast Tigers 2013–14
  Alex Scales ~ Jiangsu Dragons 2002–03, Shanghai Sharks 2004–05
  Luis Scola ~ Shanxi Brave Dragons 2017–18, Shanghai Sharks 2018–19
  Shawnelle Scott ~ Jiangsu Dragons 2003–04, Jilin Northeast Tigers 2004–05
  Garret Siler ~ Shanghai Sharks 2009–10, Jiangsu Dragons 2012–13
  James Singleton ~ Xinjiang Flying Tigers 2010–11, Guangdong Southern Tigers 2011–12, Xinjiang Flying Tigers 2012–13, 2013–14
  Donald Sloan ~ Guangdong Southern Tigers 2012–13, 2016–17, 2017–18, Jiangsu Dragons 2018–19
  Russ Smith ~ Fujian Sturgeons 2017–18, 2018–19
  Dewarick Spencer ~ Jilin Northeast Tigers 2012–13, Zhejiang Golden Bulls 2013–14
  John Spencer ~ Jiangsu Dragons 1996–97, Sichuan Pandas 1997–98
  Jarnell Stokes ~ Zhejiang Golden Bulls 2017–18, Xinjiang Flying Tigers 2018–19, 2019–20
  Mark Strickland ~ Zhejiang Cyclones 2002–03, 2003–04
  Damon Stringer ~ Shanghai Sharks 2000–01, Shaanxi Kylins 2001–02
  Jared Sullinger ~ Shenzhen Leopards 2017–18, 2018–19
  Roy Tarpley ~ Beijing Olympians 2000–01, 2001–02
  Dajuan Tate ~ Fujian Xunxing 2007–08, Shanghai Sharks 2008–09, Dongguan Leopards 2009–10
  Sebastian Telfair ~ Tianjin Gold Lions 2013–14, Xinjiang Flying Tigers 2014–15, Fujian Sturgeons 2016–17
  Malcolm Thomas ~ Jilin Northeast Tigers 2016–17, Shanxi Loongs 2019–20
  Jason Thompson ~ Shandong Golden Stars 2016–17, Sichuan Blue Whales 2018–19, Beikong Royal Fighters 2019–20
  Mack Tuck ~ Shandong Gold Lions 2004–05, 2006–07, 2007–08, 2008–09
  Jeremy Tyler ~ Shanxi Brave Dragons 2014–15, Fujian Sturgeons 2015–16, Tianjin Gold Lions 2016–17
  Jackson Vroman ~ Dongguan Leopards 2010–11, Jiangsu Dragons 2011–12, Shandong Gold Lions 2012–13, Jiangsu Dragons 2013–14
  Willie Warren ~ Chongqing Fly Dragons 2014–15, Zhejiang Golden Bulls 2015–16, 2016–17, Shanxi Brave Dragons 2017–18
  Sonny Weems ~ Zhejiang Golden Bulls 2017–18, Guangdong Southern Tigers 2018–19, 2019–20
  Delonte West ~ Fujian Sturgeons 2013–14, Shanghai Sharks 2014–15
  D.J. White ~ Shanghai Sharks 2012–13, Sichuan Blue Whales 2013–14, Fujian Sturgeons 2014–15
  Shelden Williams ~ Tianjin Gold Lions 2013–14, 2014–15
  Guerschon Yabusele ~ Shanghai Sharks 2016–17, Nanjing Monkey Kings 2019–20
  Joe Young ~ Nanjing Monkey Kings 2018–19, 2019–20

Non-Chinese players for whom 2019–20 is their 1st season in the CBA 
Scroll down to view more names
  Antonio Blakeney ~ Jiangsu Dragons 2019–20
  Dante Cunningham ~ Fujian Sturgeons 2019–20
  Kenneth Faried ~ Guangsha Lions 2019–20
  Marcus Georges-Hunt ~ Guangzhou Loong-Lions 2019–20
  Erick Green ~ Fujian Sturgeons 2019–20
  Sylven Landesberg ~ Zhejiang Golden Bulls 2019–20
  Jeremy Lin ~ Beijing Ducks 2019–20
  Jarell Martin ~ Shenzhen Aviators 2019–20
  Ray McCallum Jr. ~ Shanghai Sharks 2019–20
  Eric Mika ~ Xinjiang Flying Tigers 2019–20
  Eric Moreland ~ Shanxi Loongs 2019–20
  James Nunnally ~ Shanghai Sharks 2019–20
  Miles Plumlee ~ Guangsha Lions 2019–20
  Chasson Randle ~ Tianjin Pioneers 2019–20
  Jalen Reynolds ~ Guangsha Lions 2019–20
  Lance Stephenson ~ Liaoning Flying Leopards 2019–20
  Amar'e Stoudemire ~ Fujian Sturgeons 2019–20
  Keifer Sykes ~ Guangzhou Loong-Lions 2019–20
  Marko Todorovic ~ Tianjin Pioneers 2019–20
  Ekpe Udoh ~ Beijing Ducks 2019–20
  Dez Wells ~ Guangsha Lions 2019–20
  Behnam Yakhchali ~ Nanjing Monkey Kings 2019–20

Other Non-Chinese players who spent only 1 season in the CBA 
Scroll down to view more names.
  Josh Adams ~ Shanxi Loongs 2018–19
  Jeff Adrien ~ Guangdong Southern Tigers 2014–15
  Cole Aldrich ~ Tianjin Gold Lions 2018–19
  Alan Anderson ~ Shandong Gold Lions 2011–12
  Wael Arakji ~ Beikong Fly Dragons 2017–18
  Isaiah Austin ~ Nanjing Monkey Kings 2018–19
  Corey Benjamin ~ Xinjiang Flying Tigers 2004–05
  David Benoit ~ Shanghai Sharks 2001–02
  Ben Bentil ~ Xinjiang Flying Tigers 2016–17
  DeJuan Blair ~ Tongxi Monkey Kings 2016–17
  Ryan Boatright ~ Guangzhou Long-Lions 2016–17
  Carlos Boozer ~ Guangdong Southern Tigers 2016–17
  Kenny Boynton ~ Shenzhen Leopards 2018–19
  Aaron Brooks ~ Guangdong Southern Tigers 2011–12
  Andre Brown ~ Zhejiang Golden Bulls 2009–10
  Dee Brown ~ Qingdao Eagles 2010–11
  Rodney Carney ~ Liaoning Flying Leopards 2011–12
  Justin Carter ~ Guangdong Southern Tigers 2015–16
  Wilson Chandler ~ Guangsha Lions 2011–12
  Semaj Christon ~ Guangzhou Long-Lions 2017–18
  Earl Clark ~ Shandong Golden Stars 2014–15
  Keith Closs ~ Yunnan Bulls 2008–09
  Norris Cole ~ Shandong Golden Stars 2016–17
  Mardy Collins ~ Jiangsu Dragons 2011–12
  Brandon Costner ~ Tongxi Monkey Kings 2014–15
  Bryce Cotton ~ Xinjiang Flying Tigers 2015–16
  Jared Cunningham ~ Tongxi Monkey Kings 2016–17
  Eddy Curry ~ Zhejiang Golden Bulls 2012–13
  Ricky Davis ~ Jiangsu Dragons 2010–11
  Malcolm Delaney ~ Guangdong Southern Tigers 2018–19
  Toney Douglas ~ Jiangsu Dragons 2014–15
  Jerome Dyson ~ Jiangsu Dragons 2018–19
  Jarrid Famous ~ Fujian Sturgeons 2015–16
  Gerald Fitch ~ Foshan Dralions 2013–14
  Gary Forbes ~ Guangsha Lions 2012–13
  Steve Francis ~ Beijing Ducks 2010–11
  Dan Gadzuric ~ Jiangsu Dragons 2011–12
  Sundiata Gaines ~ Fujian Sturgeons 2012–13
  Yancy Gates ~ Shanxi Brave Dragons 2015–16
  Archie Goodwin ~ Zhejiang Golden Bulls 2018–19
  Gerald Green ~ Foshan Dralions 2011–12
  Donté Greene ~ Dongguan Leopards 2013–14
  Al Harrington ~ Fujian Sturgeons 2014–15
  Scotty Hopson ~ Foshan Long-Lions 2015–16
  Royal Ivey ~ Guangdong Southern Tigers 2013–14
  Edwin Jackson ~ Guangdong Southern Tigers 2017–18
  Al Jefferson ~ Xinjiang Flying Tigers 2018–19
  Cory Jefferson ~ Guangzhou Long-Lions 2018–19
  Brandon Jennings ~ Shanxi Brave Dragons 2017–18
  Grant Jerrett ~ Beijing Ducks 2016–17
  DerMarr Johnson ~ Jiangsu Dragons 2009–10
  Solomon Jones ~ Liaoning Flying Leopards 2012–13
  Terrence Jones ~ Qingdao Eagles 2017–18
  Jerome Jordan ~ Tongxi Monkey Kings 2015–16
  Arsalan Kazemi ~ Chongqing Fly Dragons 2014–15
  D.J. Kennedy ~ Guangzhou Long-Lions 2016–17
  Alex Kirk ~ Guangzhou Long-Lions 2016–17
  Viacheslav Kravtsov ~ Foshan Long-Lions 2014–15
  Cady Lalanne ~ Zhejiang Golden Bulls 2016–17
  Carl Landry ~ Jilin Northeast Tigers 2017–18
  Keith Langford ~ Shenzhen Leopards 2017–18
  Priest Lauderdale ~ Shandong Gold Lions 2008–09
  Gani Lawal ~ Xinjiang Flying Tigers 2011–12
  Ricky Ledo ~ Beikong Fly Dragons 2018–19
  Augusto Lima ~ Xinjiang Flying Tigers 2017–18
  Shawn Long ~ Xinjiang Flying Tigers 2017–18
  Cartier Martin ~ Jilin Northeast Tigers 2011–12
  Kenyon Martin ~ Xinjiang Flying Tigers 2011–12
  Loukas Mavrokefalidis ~ Qingdao Eagles 2016–17
  Jason Maxiell ~ Tianjin Gold Lions 2015–16
  Chris McCullough ~ Shanxi Loongs 2018–19
  Tracy McGrady ~ Qingdao Eagles 2012–13
  Dominic McGuire ~ Shenzhen Leopards 2015–16
  Jerel McNeal ~ Zhejiang Golden Bulls 2013–14
  Patty Mills ~ Xinjiang Flying Tigers 2011–12
  Jérôme Moïso ~ Jiangsu Dragons 2010–11
  J'mison Morgan ~ Chongqing Fly Dragons 2014–15
  Liam McMorrow ~ Tongxi Monkey Kings 2015–16
  Darius Morris ~ Guangdong Southern Tigers 2017–18
  Arnett Moultrie ~ Jiangsu Dragons 2014–15
  Emmanuel Mudiay ~ Guangdong Southern Tigers 2014–15
  Xavier Munford ~ Fujian Sturgeons 2018–19
  Kevin Murphy ~ Guangsha Lions 2014–15
  Greg Oden ~ Jiangsu Dragons 2015–16
  Daniel Orton ~ Sichuan Blue Whales 2014–15
  Arinze Onuaku ~ Zhejiang Golden Bulls 2017–18
  Brandon Paul ~ Zhejiang Golden Bulls 2018–19
  Adreian Payne ~ Nanjing Monkey Kings 2018–19
  Doron Perkins ~ Foshan Dralions 2012–13
  Imad Qahwash ~ Jiangsu Dragons 2012–13
  Tyrese Rice ~ Shenzhen Leopards 2017–18
  Anthony Roberson ~ Fujian Sturgeons 2011–12
  Taylor Rochestie ~ Tianjin Gold Lions 2018–19
  JaKarr Sampson ~ Shandong Golden Stars 2018–19
  Samardo Samuels ~ Jiangsu Dragons 2016–17
  Henry Sims ~ Shanxi Brave Dragons 2016–17
  Josh Smith ~ Sichuan Blue Whales 2016–17
  J.R. Smith ~ Zhejiang Golden Bulls 2011–12
  Marreese Speights ~ Guangzhou Long-Lions 2018–19
  Alex Stepheson ~ Guangzhou Long-Lions 2016–17
  Saulius Štombergas ~ Shanghai Sharks 1996–97
  Stromile Swift ~ Shandong Gold Lions 2009–10
  Maurice Taylor ~ Shanxi Brave Dragons 2009–10
  Lance Thomas ~ Foshan Dralions 2013–14
  Deon Thompson ~ Liaoning Flying Leopards 2014–15
  Marcus Thornton ~ Beijing Ducks 2017–18
  David Vanterpool ~ Jilin Northeast Tigers 1998–99
  Casper Ware ~ Tianjin Gold Lions 2015–16
  Hakim Warrick ~ Liaoning Flying Leopards 2013–14
  Bonzi Wells ~ Shanxi Brave Dragons 2008–09
  Damien Wilkins ~ Beijing Ducks 2013–14
  Alan Williams ~ Qingdao Eagles 2015–16
  Marcus D. Williams ~ Jiangsu Dragons 2011–12
  Derrick Williams ~ Tianjin Gold Lions 2017–18
  Metta World Peace (known in China as The Panda's Friend) ~ Sichuan Blue Whales 2014–15
  Dorell Wright ~ Beikong Fly Dragons 2015–16
  Khalif Wyatt ~ Guangdong Southern Tigers 2013–14

Politics
On October 4, 2019, the Houston Rockets general manager Daryl Morey issued a tweet in support of the 2019–20 Hong Kong protests. Morey's tweet resulted in the Chinese Basketball Association's suspension of its relationship with the Houston Rockets and China Central Television's removal of all NBA games from its broadcast schedule until further notice.

See also 
 Basketball in China
 China men's national basketball team
 China women's national basketball team
 National Basketball League (NBL)
 Women's Chinese Basketball Association (WCBA)
 Chinese University Basketball Association (CUBA)

References

External links 
 CBA official website 
 CBA at Asia-Basket.com
 CBA on Youtube (Unofficial)

 
1995 establishments in China
1
Basketball
Sports leagues established in 1995
Professional sports leagues in China